German Wings was a scheduled German airline that operated for a few years in the late 1980s.

History
The history of German Wings can be traced to 1983 and began as a small air taxi firm called Airflight. In 1986 the name was changed to German Wings and in April 1989 it commenced scheduled flights using MD-83 aircraft. This airline offered fewer seats per plane (114 instead of the normal 172). The main operating hub was in Munich and from there it flew to Frankfurt, Cologne, Hamburg and Paris.

German Wings was the first (and unsuccessful) attempt at attacking Lufthansa's domestic stronghold. The airline had all Business class service. Although the public supported German Wings from the beginning, the new airline was not granted enough slots at airports to operate profitably and by 1990 it was in serious financial problems.  In April 1990 the airline went bankrupt.

Fleet

McDonnell Douglas MD-83

References

External links

Fleet and code information

Defunct airlines of Germany
Airlines established in 1983
Airlines disestablished in 1990
Defunct charter airlines
1983 establishments in West Germany
1990 disestablishments in West Germany